Ilga Šuplinska (born  in Dagda) is a Latvian politician. From 23 January 2019 to 3 June 2021, she served as Minister for Education and Science in the Kariņš cabinet.

References 

Living people
1970 births
Ministers of Education and Science of Latvia
21st-century Latvian politicians
New Conservative Party (Latvia) politicians
21st-century Latvian women politicians